Dabreras is a Neotropical butterfly genus  in the family Lycaenidae. The genus is monotypic containing the single species Dabreras teucria, which is found from Venezuela to Peru and Brazil.

References

Lycaenidae of South America
Eumaeini
Monotypic butterfly genera